The Cape May Formation is a geologic formation in New Jersey. It preserves fossils.

See also

 List of fossiliferous stratigraphic units in New Jersey
 Paleontology in New Jersey

References
 

Geologic formations of New Jersey